James Martin Bell (October 16, 1796 – April 4, 1849) was an American lawyer and politician who served one term as a U.S. Representative from Ohio from 1833 to 1835.

Biography 
Born in Huntingdon County, Pennsylvania, Bell attended the public schools.
He studied law in Steubenville, Ohio.
He was admitted to the bar in 1817 and commenced practice in Cambridge, Ohio.

He served as major general of the Fifteenth Division, Ohio Militia.

He served as prosecuting attorney of Guernsey County 1818–1832.
He served as member of the State house of representatives 1826–1831, serving as speaker in 1830 and 1831.
He served as master commissioner in 1827.
He was in the Justice of the Peace in 1830.
County school examiner in 1830.

Congress
Bell was elected as an Anti-Jacksonian to the Twenty-third Congress (March 4, 1833 – March 3, 1835).
He was an unsuccessful candidate for reelection in 1834 to the Twenty-fourth Congress.

Career after Congress 
He resumed the practice of law.
He served as mayor of Cambridge from 1838 to 1840.

Death
He died in Cambridge, Ohio, on April 4, 1849.
He was interred in Founders' Burial Ground.

Sources

1796 births
1849 deaths
People from Cambridge, Ohio
19th-century American politicians
Speakers of the Ohio House of Representatives
American militia generals
County district attorneys in Ohio
Mayors of places in Ohio
National Republican Party members of the United States House of Representatives from Ohio
Members of the Ohio House of Representatives